Sagowr-e Hanzaleh (also Romanized as Sagowr-e Ḩanz̧aleh and Şagowr-e Ḩanz̧aleh; also known as Sagowr-e Khanz̧aleh) is a village in Allah-o Akbar Rural District, in the Central District of Dasht-e Azadegan County, Khuzestan Province, Iran. At the 2006 census, its population was 241, in 32 families.

References 

Populated places in Dasht-e Azadegan County